Robinsons Ferry, California may refer to:
 Bridgeville, California
 Melones, California
 Robinson's Ferry, California